Palghar Sai Baba Temple is a Hindu temple that lies in Vevoor, in the Palghar district of Maharashtra, India. The Sai Baba temple of Vevoor is located approximately 1 km from palghar(E) station.

References

Hindu temples in Maharashtra